The McGehee Plantation is a historic site and former cotton plantation, located at 50 Ed Nelson Drive in Senatobia, Mississippi. The mansion has been listed on the National Register of Historic Places since July 3, 2007, for its architectural significance.

History
The land belonged to the Chickasaw Nation until 1830. In 1854, it was acquired by planter Abner F. McGehee, the son of Hugh McGehee, and nephew of Edward McGehee. The Mississippi and Tennessee Railroad ran through the grounds, making it a desirable business opportunity.

The mansion, designed in the Greek Revival architectural style, was completed in 1856. The mansion was built with the forced labor of enslaved African Americans, who also picked cotton in the fields.

Author Stark Young grew up on the plantation, as his mother was a direct descendant of McGehee. His 1934 novel, So Red the Rose, was based on this plantation, thus the fictionalized version was set in Natchez, Mississippi.

References

Plantation houses in Mississippi
Houses completed in 1856
Houses on the National Register of Historic Places in Mississippi
National Register of Historic Places in Tate County, Mississippi
Antebellum architecture
Greek Revival houses in Mississippi
Cotton plantations in Mississippi